CKNS was a former radio station which operated on 930 kHz (AM) in Espanola, Ontario, Canada.

History
On February 6, 1976, Algonquin Radio-TV Co. Ltd. was given approval to operate a new AM station at Espanola.  It would broadcast on 930 kHz with a power of 10,000 watts. CKNS began broadcasting at 930 kHz on October 2, 1976.  The station was a semi-satellite of CKNR in Elliot Lake which began broadcasting in 1967. The "NS" in the call sign: North Shore.

In the mid-1980s, Mid-Canada Communications was approved by the CRTC to acquire CKNS from Huron Broadcasting Limited.

In 1986 CKNS received approval to disaffiliate from the CBC radio network, which is now served by CBCE-FM out of Little Current. In 1990, the Pelmorex Radio Network received approval to acquire CKNS from Mid-Canada Communications. In 1996, CKNS and its sister stations CKNR and CJNR were sold to North Channel Broadcasters, which established the contemporary CKNR-FM and shut down all three AM signals.

References

External links

CKNS at recnet.com

KNS
Kns
Espanola, Ontario
Radio stations established in 1976
1976 establishments in Ontario
1996_disestablishments_in_Ontario 
Radio stations disestablished in 1996
KNS (AM)